Nor of Human:  An Anthology of Fantastic Creatures is the first short story anthology published by the Canberra Speculative Fiction Guild. Printed in 2001 under  and edited by Geoffrey Maloney, it contains stories from several Australian speculative fiction authors.

The anthology was one of the first projects the newly founded CSFG embarked on, as a way to provide a focus for members' activities and as a showcase for their work.  The theme of "fantastic creatures" was inspired by a guest speaker at one of the Guild meetings, the Australian cryptozoologist known as "Tim the Yowie Man", and two of the anthology stories feature yowies (a creature roughly comparable to the American Bigfoot).  The book was launched by SF writer Jack Dann.

The book was shortlisted for four Aurealis Awards: "The Trojan Rocks", "Tales from the True Desert" and "Happy Birthday To Me" were listed for the science fiction, fantasy and horror categories respectively while Geoffrey Maloney was shortlisted for his work in editing the collection.  Although the shortlist performance was strong the book did not take out the awards themselves.

The collection is "Dedicated to all the creators of speculative fiction, past, present and future; whether or not of human…" All stories in the collection are illustrated by Les Petersen.

Stories
The collection contains the following stories:

The Trojan Rocks  by Michael Barry
Wyvern's Blood by Chris Andrews
Cacachatol by Peter Barrett
Tales From The True Desert by Matthew Farrer
Playing Possum by Maxine McArthur
Fringe Dwellers by Robbie Matthews
Perfect Parasite by Carole Nomarhas
Sasquatch Winter by Les Petersen
Quacaha by Allan Price
Claw by Paul Ryan
Flap by Antony Searle
Stark Raving Mad by Geoff Skellams
Camp Yowie by Krystle and Mark Snitch
Happy Birthday to Me by Alison Venugoban

See also

Elsewhere
Encounters
Gastronomicon
Machinations: An Anthology of Ingenious Designs
The Grinding House
The Outcast

External links
CSFG home page
Maxine McArthur home page
Les Petersen home page
SFADB Aurealis Awards Winners 2002

2001 anthologies
Fiction anthologies
Australian anthologies